The Will to Fly is a 2016 feature documentary film about the Australian Olympic freestyle skier gold medalist Lydia Lassila.

The film was produced by Katie Bender who co-directed the film with her partner Leo Baker. The film made its Australian premiere in Melbourne on International Women's Day (8 March), 2016 followed by a theatrical release where it was positively received by critics.

Synopsis
The Will to Fly is the story of Olympic Champion Lydia Lassila who, as a young mum and against all the odds competing in one of the world's most dangerous sports, dares to reach for an almost impossible dream.

The film takes us on a journey through the genesis of Lydia’s tenacity; from the missed opportunities with her first love, gymnastics, to her transition into an aerial skiing career of extreme highs and lows in the world’s most competitive and decorated team.
After winning the gold medal at her third Olympic games in 2010, Lydia became a mother. She then returned to aerial skiing with the intent of becoming the first woman to perform the sport's most complex acrobatic manoeuvre; an ambitious benchmark she set for herself when she first discovered the sport, and one that had only ever been achieved by male aerialists before her.

The film chronicles Lydia’s lifelong pursuit to reach personal fulfilment by achieving her true potential, on the world stage at the Sochi Olympics in 2014.

Impact

In October 2015, before the release of The Will To Fly, the film was used as a catalyst in convincing NSW (Australian) parliament to invest in a $10 million Olympic training facility so that the Australian Winter Olympic team could train on home soil.

"It has been 10 years in the making, but Australia’s Winter Olympic leaders finally have the green light to build a water ramp facility they believe will underpin future international success".

NSW Sports Minister Stuart Ayres announced in June 2016 that the $10 million facility will be built at the Lake Ainsworth Sport and Recreation Centre at Lennox Head in subtropical northern NSW.

"The godfather of Australian winter sport, Olympic Winter Institute chairman Geoff Henke, believes a screening of a documentary on Lassila’s preparation for the Sochi Winter Olympics, The Will to Fly, in the NSW parliament house this year achieved the breakthrough. Ayres and his office staff all attended, as did Treasury staff".

“That’s when they understood what it was all about. Henke said."

In August 2017, Olympic champion hurdler Sally Pearson made headlines worldwide after coming out of retirement to win the 2017 world championship title. Pearson told the media that her comeback to sport was motivated after watching The Will To Fly film on a plane in 2016.

"The acclaimed movie ‘The Will to Fly’ struck a chord with Pearson and triggered a series of events that ultimately led to her triumphant return in London."
“I was on a plane going from the Gold Coast,” Pearson said. “I was scrolling through the movies on the TV and came across it.

“Her resilience to get back and get to the top again was truly inspirational.”

The Rio Olympics were about to start but Pearson wasn’t there to defend her crown because injuries had forced her withdrawal just a few weeks earlier.

“I was in such a horrible dark place, more so because I’m such a harsh critic of myself,” Pearson told the BBC.

“When I missed the Olympics, I hated everything, I hated everyone and I didn’t want to be anywhere.

“I wanted to run away but there was a voice in the back of my head saying, ‘But what if, what if, what if’.

“I watched her movie and she had those what ifs and she still did it, Lydia came out better for it.”

By the time she’d left Gold Coast airport, the 2012 Olympic champion had decided she would not only return to her sport but would also coach herself.

“I was on a bit of a downer at that moment, I’d been let down by a few people,” Pearson said.

“My injuries have been a result of maybe bad coaching, bad choices as well.

“I didn’t really know what I wanted and whether to stay in the sport, whether to retire.

“Then I thought, ‘What the hell am I going to do? I don’t really have anything else but my sport’.

“I walked off the plane and still had the movie stuck in my head.

“As soon as I walked out the door of the airport, I was like, ‘Right I am coaching myself, I’m going stay in sport and we’ll see what happens.”

Pearson, 30, went back to training and within 12 months was the champion of the world again.

“As soon as I made that decision everything seemed light again and easy and I made choices, I made the right choices,” she said.

“The main thing you have to have is resilience. I found that in me after watched I that movie, I found the resilience I needed to come back.

“So I want to send huge thanks (to Lydia) for her putting that movie out which I choose to watch.”

Film awards and nominations
 Winner, Best World Documentary Award, Whistler Film Festival 2016
 Winner, Best Mountain Culture Film Award, Whistler Film Festival 2016
 Nomination, APRA AMCOS award for Best Music In Documentary, APRA AMCOS Awards Australia 2016

Participants
 Lydia Lassila 
 Jacqui Cooper
 Alisa Camplin 
 Kai Lassila 
 Lauri Lassila 
 Phyllis Ierodiaconou 
 Kirstie Marshall
 Frank Bare, Jr. 
 Chick Ierodiaconou
 Peter Braun 
 Dennis Capicik 
 Lainie Cole 
 Dmitri Dashinski 
 Elizabeth Gardner
 Jeffrey Hodges 
 George Ierodiaconou 
 Peppi Ierodiaconou 
 Erkki Lassila
 Leena Lassila 
 Xu Mengtao
 David Morris 
 Bree Munroe
 Daniel Murphy 
 Li Nina
 Steve Omischl 
 Michel Roth
 Warren Shouldice 
 Cord Spero 
 Dusty Wilson

References

External links

Skiing films
Australian sports documentary films
2010s English-language films